This page documents all tornadoes confirmed by various weather forecast offices of the National Weather Service in the United States in April 2018. Tornado counts are considered preliminary until final publication in the database of the National Centers for Environmental Information.

United States yearly total

April

April 3 event

April 6 event

April 7 event

April 10 event

April 13 event

April 14 event

April 15 event

April 22 event

April 23 event

April 27 event

See also
 Tornadoes of 2018
 List of United States tornadoes from January to March 2018
 List of United States tornadoes in May 2018

Notes

References

2018 natural disasters in the United States
2018-related lists
Tornadoes of 2018
Tornadoes
2018, 04